Douglas McKenzie Somner (born 4 July 1951 in Edinburgh) is a Scottish former footballer, who played for clubs including Partick Thistle and St Mirren. He was the first player ever to score for St Mirren in European competition. He finished as the top scorer in the Scottish Football League Premier Division in the 1979–80 season.

References

1951 births
Ayr United F.C. players
East Kilbride Thistle F.C. players
Falkirk F.C. players
Hamilton Academical F.C. players
Living people
Montrose F.C. players
Partick Thistle F.C. players
Scottish Football League players
Scottish Football League representative players
Scottish footballers
Scottish Junior Football Association players
Footballers from Edinburgh
St Mirren F.C. players
Scottish league football top scorers
Association football forwards